Cambridgeshire is a county in eastern England, with an area of  and a population as of 2011 of 708,719. It is crossed by two major rivers, the Nene and the Great Ouse. The main manufacturing area is Peterborough, and the foundation of the University of Cambridge in the thirteenth century made the county one of the country's most important intellectual centres. A large part of the county is in The Fens, and drainage of this habitat, which was probably commenced in the Roman period and largely completed by the seventeenth century, considerably increased the area available for agriculture.

The administrative county was formed in 1974, incorporating most of the historic county of Huntingdonshire. Local government is divided between Cambridgeshire County Council and Peterborough City Council, which is a separate unitary authority. Under the county council, there are five district councils, Cambridge City Council, South Cambridgeshire District Council, East Cambridgeshire District Council, Huntingdonshire District Council and Fenland District Council.

Local nature reserves (LNRs) are designated by local authorities, which must have legal control over the site, by owning it, leasing it or having an agreement with the owner. LNRs are sites which have a special local interest biologically, geologically or for education. Local authorities can either manage sites themselves or through other groups such as "friends of" and wildlife trusts, and can apply local bye-laws to manage and protect LNRs.

There are twenty-seven LNRs in Cambridgeshire. Four are Sites of Special Scientific Interest, and five are managed by the Wildlife Trust for Bedfordshire, Cambridgeshire and Northamptonshire. The largest is Little Paxton Pits at sixty hectares, which is of national importance for wintering wildfowl, and the smallest is St Denis Churchyard, East Hatley, which has grassland with diverse flowers. There is public access to all sites.

Key

Other classifications
 SSSI = Site of Special Scientific Interest
 WTBCN = Wildlife Trust for Bedfordshire, Cambridgeshire and Northamptonshire

Sites

See also
List of Sites of Special Scientific Interest in Cambridgeshire

Notes

References

Cambridgeshire
 
Cambridgeshire